John Stoughton (died 1422 or after), of Guildford, Surrey, was an English politician.

He was a Member (MP) of the Parliament of England for Guildford in 1419. He was the son of John Stoughton, and the father is the one named regularly in other records – nothing further is known of the MP. The Stoughton family represented Guildford many times.

References

Year of birth missing
15th-century deaths
English MPs 1419
Members of Parliament for Guildford